Ilya Boltrushevich (born 30 March 1999) is a Belarusian footballer who plays for Dnepr Mogilev.

He is a son of former Belarusian international player Eduard Boltrushevich.

References

External links

1999 births
Living people
People from Mogilev
Sportspeople from Mogilev Region
Belarusian footballers
Association football defenders
FC Dnepr Mogilev players
FC Shakhtyor Soligorsk players
FC Dnyapro Mogilev players
FC Lida players
FC Belshina Bobruisk players
FC Smorgon players
FC Isloch Minsk Raion players